John Marcus Fleming (1911 – 3 February 1976) was a British economist. He was the deputy director of the research department of the International Monetary Fund for many years; he was already a member of this department during the period of Canadian economist Robert Mundell's affiliation. At approximately the same time as Mundell, Fleming presented similar research on stabilization policy in open economies. As a result, today's textbooks refer to the Mundell–Fleming model. Mundell's contribution, which assumes perfect rather than imperfect capital mobility is, however, considered more important due to its depth, range, and analytical power, and more applicable to today's conditions.

He was educated at Bathgate Academy and the University of Edinburgh, the Graduate Institute of International Studies in Geneva, and the London School of Economics.

Publications
Dual exchange market and other remedies for disruptive capital flows, IMF Staff Papers, March 1974.

External links

  The Royal Swedish Academy of Sciences has decided to award the Bank of Sweden Prize in Economic Sciences in Memory of Alfred Nobel, 1999 to Professor Robert A. Mundell
 Reprinted in 

                   

1911 births
1976 deaths
People educated at Bathgate Academy
Alumni of the University of Edinburgh
Graduate Institute of International and Development Studies alumni
20th-century British  economists